Highway 789 is a provincial highway in the Canadian province of Saskatchewan. It runs from Highway 3 within the Muskoday First Nation to Highway 690 near Connell Creek.

Highway 789 also passes near Brockington, Gronlid, Codette, and Carrot River. Highway 789 has a  concurrency with Highway 6 and a  concurrency with Highway 23.

Major intersections
From west to east:

See also 
Roads in Saskatchewan
Transportation in Saskatchewan

References 

789